Kitty Anderson may refer to:
 Kitty Anderson (activist), Icelandic intersex activist

 Dame Katherine Anderson, known as Kitty Anderson (1903–1979), English headmistress